Juan Carlos García Granda is a Cuban politician currently serving as the Minister of Tourism of Cuba. He served as first deputy minister under former Minister of Tourism Manuel Marrero Cruz until Cruz's appointment to the office of Prime Minister in December 2019.

Career 
García has advocated for the construction of additional "emblematic" luxury hotels in the country. In November 2019, he inaugurated the Paseo del Prado Hotel in Havana in the company of the former First Secretary of the Communist Party of Cuba, Raúl Castro, and the former President of Cuba, Miguel Díaz-Canel. He has also advocated for the strengthening of bilateral ties with Canada, which ranks first among the issuers of visitors.

References 

Cuban politicians
Tourism ministers of Cuba
Government ministers of Cuba
Living people
Year of birth missing (living people)